Carolina Fadic Maturana (Santiago, February 27, 1974 – ibid, October 12 of 2002) was an actress and television presenter from Chile. She started her career when she was only 19 years old, when she was chosen by the director Vicente Sabatini to star in his successful productions of the 1990s. She played the main role in the telenovelas Rompecorazón (1994), Estúpido cupido (1995), Oro verde (1997), Algo está cambiando (1999) and Sabor a ti (2000), since then it began to be considered as one of the most profitable actresses in the television industry. Her debut in cinema was with the film La rubia de Kennedy by director Arnaldo Valsecchi, and her last film was Antonia  (2001). On television, she was also one of the hosts of the entertainment program . Fadic died on October 12, 2002, due to a stroke, while she was at the height of her career when only was 28 years old. Her unexpected death caused grief and commotion in Chile.

Filmography

Film

Telenovelas

References

1974 births
Actresses from Santiago
Chilean television actresses
Chilean telenovela actresses
2002 deaths
Chilean people of Croatian descent